Don Stitt (born January 25, 1956) is an American actor and playwright who has been featured in four Broadway musicals, appeared 20 times on the Late Show with David Letterman, and starred in countless commercials.

Stitt graduated from Carlmont High (1973) and attended San Francisco State University (1977), in 2007 he received his MFA in professional writing from Western Connecticut State University.

Born January 25, 1956 in Stamford, Connecticut, Stitt had an early fascination with magic and magicians. A visit to the Society of American Magicians convention in 1965 resulted in his first paid, professional booking as a Dutch boy doll in The Magical Spirit of Christmas, a musical presented by The Manhattan Savings Bank, which starred legendary magician and author, Milbourne Christopher.

In 1968, he did a radio commercial for Teen magazine, for which he also wrote the ad copy.

At San Francisco State University, Stitt wrote, directed, choreographed, and scored several full-length musicals. One of them, A Kid's Summer Night's Dream, was produced professionally in New York in 1979 and was revived in Minnesota in 2006, where it won 6 awards.

When he was 20, Stitt became the first full-time replacement in the long-running musical, Beach Blanket Babylon.

A year later, he became a member of Actors' Equity Association as a cast member of The Great American Backstage Musical.

In 1978, Stitt created, coauthored, codirected, and choreographed  "Irving Berlin in Revue" which would run for two years at the Chi Chi Theatre Club in San Francisco's North Beach district, and which was revived in 1993.

Stitt was featured in the original Broadway casts of Do Black Patent Leather Shoes Really Reflect Up?, Late Nite Comic, and Buddy: The Buddy Holly Story. He also appeared as Marcus Lycus in the 1996 Broadway revival of A Funny Thing Happened on the Way to the Forum, replacing Ernie Sabella.

He toured nationally in Cole Porter's Can-Can with Chita Rivera and The Rockettes for over a year.

In 2007, Stitt received an MFA in playwriting from Western Connecticut State University.

The same year, he presented his autobiographical solo-piece, The Voices in my Head Have Formed a Choir and Somebody's Singing Flat! at the Edinburgh Fringe Festival.

He won an AWP award for his poem, "Ode to Bobby", in 2005. He was also honored by Musicals Online for his book and lyrics for Roscoe: A Slapstick Tragedy. 

He is married to television scenic designer Elizabeth Popiel.

External links
http://www.doollee.com/PlaywrightsS/stitt-don.html
http://ibdb.com/person.php?id=76003
https://web.archive.org/web/20100627220716/http://library.wcsu.edu/web/about/units/archives/findingaids/stitt.xml

San Francisco State University alumni
Western Connecticut State University alumni
American male stage actors
1956 births
Living people
American male dramatists and playwrights
20th-century American male actors
Male actors from Stamford, Connecticut
21st-century American dramatists and playwrights
21st-century American male writers